Yona of the Dawn is an anime series produced by Pierrot and directed by Kazuhiro Yoneda. The series follows Yona, the princess of the Kouka Kingdom, who is chased out of the castle with her bodyguard, Son Hak, after her father is murdered at the hands of Yona's cousin, Soo-Won. Together, the two embark on a journey to find the legendary four dragons, in order to seek their aid in reclaiming the kingdom. It aired between October 7, 2014, and March 24, 2015, on AT-X. Funimation has licensed the anime series for streaming and home video rights in North America. Beginning on March 17, 2015, Funimation streamed their dubbed version of the anime, starting with episode 13. The second opening theme is "Akatsuki no Hana", by Cyntia, and the second ending theme is "Akatsuki", by Akiko Shikata. Three original video animations were bundled with the manga's 19th, 21st and 22nd limited edition volumes, respectively. The first OVA was released on September 18, 2015, the second OVA was released on August 19, 2016, and the third OVA was released on December 20, 2016.

Episode list

References

External links
 Official Hana to Yume Akatsuki no Yona manga site 
 Official Akatsuki no Yona anime site 
 

Lists of anime episodes